Deveaux is a surname of French origin. Notable people with the surname include:

Andre Deveaux, Bahamian ice hockey player
Kevin Deveaux, Canadian politician
Patricia Deveaux, Bahamian politician
Samuel DeVeaux, American judge; left estate to establish the DeVeaux School in 1853 in Niagara Falls, New York

Fictional characters:
Charles Deveaux, character on Heroes
Gabby Deveaux, character on The L Word
Simone Deveaux, character on Heroes
Rory Deveaux, protagonist in The Shades of London series

See also
Devereaux
Devereux

Surnames of French origin